Jason Hirschhorn is an American media executive and entrepreneur. He is the CEO of REDEF, a digital content curation company, and its chief curator.

References

New York University alumni
Living people
Chief digital officers
Year of birth missing (living people)
American chief executives
Businesspeople from New York City